Brigadeführer was a paramilitary rank of the Nazi Party (NSDAP) that was used between the years of 1932 to 1945.  It was mainly known for its use as an SS rank. As an SA rank, it was used after briefly being known as Untergruppenführer in late 1929 and 1930.

The rank was first created due to an expansion of the SS and assigned to those officers in command of SS-Brigaden. In 1933, the SS-Brigaden were changed in name to SS-Abschnitte; however, the rank of Brigadeführer remained the same.

Originally, Brigadeführer was considered the second general officer rank of the SS and ranked between Oberführer and Gruppenführer. This changed with the rise of the Waffen-SS and the Ordnungspolizei. In both of those organizations, Brigadeführer was the equivalent to a Generalmajor and ranked above an Oberst in the German Army or police. The rank of Generalmajor was the equivalent of brigadier general, a one-star general in the US Army.

The insignia for Brigadeführer was at first two oak leaves and a silver pip, however was changed in April 1942 to a three oak leaf design after the creation of the rank SS-Oberst-Gruppenführer.

Brigadeführer in the Waffen-SS or police also wore the shoulder insignia of a Generalmajor and were referred to as such after their SS rank (e.g. SS-Brigadeführer und Generalmajor der Waffen-SS und Polizei).

Insignia

See also 
Corps colours (Waffen-SS)
List SS-Brigadeführer
Table of ranks and insignia of the Waffen-SS

Notes

Bibliography 

 
 
 
 

 
SS ranks
Nazi paramilitary ranks
German words and phrases
One-star officers of Nazi Germany
Lists of generals